Bofors 57 mm Naval Automatic Gun L/60 ( (57 mm SAK 60)), also known as 57 mm/60 (2.25") SAK Model 1950 and the like (full English product name: Bofors 57 mm Automatic A.A. Gun L/60 In Stabilized Twin Turret), was a twin-barreled  caliber fully automatic dual purpose naval artillery piece designed by the Swedish arms manufacturer Bofors from the end of the 1940s to the early 1950s to meet a request from the Dutch Navy. Besides the Dutch Navy, the weapon was also adopted by the Swedish and the French Navy, most predominantly by the latter.

Design 
The Bofors 57 mm Naval Automatic Gun L/60 is at its core a scaled up version of the famous Bofors 40 mm Automatic Gun L/70, but constructed as a twin-gun system sharing the same receiver/mantle with ammunition feeding from the sides into each gun. The guns were water-cooled and fed by large 80-cartridge magazines that allowed several long bursts to be fired without reloading.

Use in the Dutch Navy 

The Dutch were the initial users of the Bofors 57 mm Naval Automatic Gun L/60. This request led to the creation of the Bofors 57 mm Naval Automatic Gun L/60, which entered active service with the Dutch Navy in 1953 mounted on the cruisers De Ruyter and De Zeven Provinciën.

Use in the Swedish Navy 

Following the Dutch example, the Swedish navy decided to acquire the new 57 mm system for a new generation of destroyers in 1950. The weapon was initially designated 57 mm automatkanon m/50 (57 mm akan m/50), meaning "57 mm autocannon m/50", but around 1970 the weapon was redesignated to 57 mm torndubbelautomatpjäs m/50 (57 mm tdblapjäs m/50), meaning "57 mm turret double automatic piece m/50" (literal).

The gun was in use until the Halland-class destroyers were taken out of service.

Use in the French Navy 

The Bofors 57 mm L/60 naval gun was also purchased by the French Navy and came to serve on a number of naval-vessels under the designation 57mm/60 modèle 1951 (57mm/60 mle 51) from 1952 onward, although primarily post 1956. The French navy version of the system featured a French designed naval mount that maintained the system in mechanical equilibrium, even when firing. The French mounting was some 8 tons lighter than the Dutch/Swedish version.

In French service the gun notably armed light escorts as main guns and larger ships as secondary guns. The following French ships were armed with the 57mm/60 mle 51 system:
 The battleship  (1952 retrofit)
 The anti-aircraft cruiser 
 The anti-aircraft cruiser 
 s
 T 47-class fleet escorts (also known as the Surcouf class)
 T 53-class fleet escorts

See also 
Bofors 57 mm Automatic Anti-Aircraft Gun L/60 – single gun anti air development of the Bofors 57 mm Naval Automatic Gun L/60
Bofors 57 mm Naval Automatic Gun L/70 – single gun replacement design for the Bofors 57 mm Naval Automatic Gun L/60
Bofors 120 mm Automatic Gun L/50

References

Notes

External links 

 57 mm/60 Modèle 1951 on NavWeaps.com
 Bofors automatic 57mm Dual-Purpose guns

Naval guns of France
57 mm artillery
Military equipment introduced in the 1950s